AP or in full Artesis Plantijn University College Antwerp, founded in 1995, is a non-profit public higher education institution located in the urban setting of the city of Antwerp (population range of 250,000-499,999 inhabitants) and created as a merger between Artesis Hogeschool Antwerpen and Plantijn Hogeschool.

In the 2013–2014 academic year, the university college started with 22 bachelor programs, 6 art courses and more than 8,500 students. On 12 December 2012, Artesis Plantijn Hogeschool Antwerp was announced as the new name for the Antwerp merger.[1] [2] The Artesis Plantijn Hogeschool is also a member of AUHA, the Association University and Colleges Antwerp.

History

Artesis Hogeschool Antwerpen

Artesis Hogeschool Antwerpen (Artesis University College Antwerp)() was a major college in Flanders, Belgium, with campuses in Antwerp, Mechelen, Lier and Turnhout. In 2013, some departments including design sciences and engineering merged with the University of Antwerp and others, merged with the Plantijn Hogeschool to form the Artesis Plantijn Hogeschool Antwerpen. It comprised numerous departments, ranging from Linguistics and Industrial Engineering to Teacher Training and Applied Computer Science.

Former faculties
 Architecture - since 2013 incorporated into the University of Antwerp
 Audio-Visual and Plastic Art
 Healthcare
 Business Management
 Industrial Science and Technology
 Music and the Performing Arts
 Educational Instruction and Teaching
 Product Development
 Social Work and Commitment
 Applied Linguistics

Plantijn Hogeschool
The Plantijn Hogeschool (Plantijn University College)() was a university college in Belgium, located in Antwerp, Belgium. The college was part of the Antwerp University Association (AUHA). In 2013 this college was merged with the Artesis Hogeschool Antwerpen.

Academization and merger in 2013
On 5 July 2012, the Flemish Parliament approved a reform of higher education. The Bologna Declaration of 1999 proposed a reform of European education and introduced bachelor's and master's degrees. Starting with the academic year 2013–2014, Flemish higher education programs were integrated into the universities (academization). Colleges in the city and province of Antwerp were merged and a gender balance was introduced in many boards: [3] [4]

 Academization eliminates the difference between academic programs at universities and academic-level programs at universities of applied sciences. The 22,000 students involved will not be physically relocated, but the universities will be responsible for the education and research policy, the quality assurance, the personnel policy and the issuing of the diplomas. The personnel involved make the transition to the university while retaining rights and obligations. The academic art courses are an exception and remain specific because of their specific character within the colleges of higher education. In order to properly supervise academization, there will be a School of Arts, a separate structure in which the universities also sit.
 In October 2013, new pluralist colleges were created through mergers with greater autonomy for their operation and composition. Artesis and Plantijn were merged in Antwerp. Pascale de Groote became general director of the Artesis Plantijn Hogeschool Antwerp, she was department head of the Royal Conservatoire of Antwerp from 2001 to 2013.
 An important new aspect is the gender balance. In October 2013, many important bodies in higher education were composed of a maximum of 2/3 board members of the same sex.

Faculties
The Artesis Plantijn Hogeschool Antwerpen consists of four departments and two schools of arts:
 Department of Health and Welfare
 Department of Management and Communication
 Department of Education and Training
 Department of Science and Technology
 Royal Conservatoire of Antwerp
 Royal Academy of Fine Arts Antwerp

Campuses
The university college consists of seven campuses, all located in Antwerp. The head office of the university college is located in the Lange Nieuwstraat. From September 2015, the campuses Boom, Mechelen, Paardenmarkt, Merksem and 't Zuid were brought together in Campus Spoor Noord. [5] This includes the two campuses Noorderplaats and Ellermanstraat. With an area of 30,000 m², there is room for 3500 students.

 Campus Noorderplaats (Department of Health and Welfare and Department of Education and Training)
 Campus Ellermanstraat (Department of Science and Technology)
 Campus Kronenburg (Department of Science and Technology)
 Campus Lange Nieuwstraat (Department of Health and Welfare)
 Campus Meistraat (Departments Management and Communication)
 Campus Mutsaard (Royal Academy of Fine Arts Antwerp)
 Campus deSingel (Royal Conservatory of Antwerp)

Research
AP Hogeschool Antwerpen
AP Hogeschool Antwerpen | Ranking & Review
Artesis Plantijn University College Antwerp,University colleges • Higher education institutions database • Study in Flanders

Sources 
Artesis Plantijn Hogeschool Antwerpen

References

External links 
 Artesis Pantijn Hogeschool Antwerpen
 Associatie Universiteit & Hogescholen Antwerpen (AUHA)
 Plantijn Hogeschool
Research:
Official research news (Dutch)
E-lab, Department of applied engineering - electronics/ICT 

Colleges in Belgium
Education in Antwerp
1995 establishments in Belgium
Universities and colleges formed by merger in Belgium